The Conservatoire à rayonnement régional de Poitiers is a school of higher education for music, drama, and dance located in Poitiers, France. The institution is a charter school of France's Ministry of Culture and is operated by the Direction régionale des affaires culturelles. The conservatory awards degrees in music performance, music education, choreographic studies, and theater.

Notable alumni
Camille Berthomier
Jean-Philippe Biojout
Gerd Boder
Isabelle Ferron

Notable faculty
Yves Beaunesne
Antoine Geoffroy-Dechaume
Noémi Rime

External links
Official Website of the Poitiers Conservatoire

 
Education in Nouvelle-Aquitaine
Music schools in France
Dance schools in France